Angara is a village in East Godavari district of Andhra Pradesh in India.

References

Villages in East Godavari district